Potamothrix is a genus of annelids belonging to the family Naididae.

Species:
 Potamothrix alatus Finogenova, 1972 
 Potamothrix bavaricus (Oschmann, 1913) 
 Potamothrix bedoti (Piguet, 1913)

References

Naididae